Zhaoming may refer to:

Zhao Ming of Shang, prehistoric ancestor of the Shang kings
Xiao Tong (501–531), also known as Crown Prince Zhaoming, crown prince of the Liang dynasty
Duan Suying (died 1009), also known as Emperor Zhaoming, emperor of Dali